Lake Nixon is a private recreation area on Cooper Orbit Road on the southwestern outskirts of Little Rock, Arkansas. The south side of the lake is in a natural state, while the central portion of the north shore has been developed as a summer day camp. The site of the camp was the subject of a ground-breaking civil rights case, Daniel v. Paul, decided by the United States Supreme Court in 1969. The camp was in 1966 a private enterprise offering membership for a low fee ($.25) to whites, but refused to grant memberships to African-Americans. Two African American girls sought admission to the grounds during a heat wave in 1966, and filed suit after they were refused. The Supreme Court ruled that the club constituted a public accommodation under civil rights legislation. This case was key in combatting the use of private clubs as a means for racial discrimination.

The lake and surrounding amenities were listed on the National Register of Historic Places in 2017.

See also
National Register of Historic Places listings in Little Rock, Arkansas

References

Nixon
Little Rock, Arkansas
National Register of Historic Places in Little Rock, Arkansas